Jihad Salame (born 7 August 1962) is a Lebanese sprinter. He competed in the men's 100 metres at the 1988 Summer Olympics.

References

1962 births
Living people
Athletes (track and field) at the 1988 Summer Olympics
Lebanese male sprinters
Olympic athletes of Lebanon
Place of birth missing (living people)